The Tropfest short film festival is held in Sydney, Australia each year. This is the List of 2006's Short Listed films and winners.

Malice In Wonderland

Dairy Farmers Youth Award 2006
Directed by Sarah Goddard and Emily-Kate Byrne
Shot on:  16mm

Tropfest
Tropfest finalists